The Equatorial Guinea national football team (Spanish: Selección de fútbol de Guinea Ecuatorial) represents Equatorial Guinea in men's international football and is controlled by the Equatoguinean Football Federation, a member of the Confederation of African Football (CAF).

The team has never qualified for the FIFA World Cup, but has qualified for the Africa Cup of Nations on three occasions, the first two times as hosts (in 2012 and 2015). They reached the quarter-finals in 2012 and 2021 and finished in fourth place in 2015.

History
Equatorial Guinea played its first match on 23 May 1975 against China in a friendly, losing 6–2. They did not play another game until entering the 1985 UDEAC Cup in December 1985. They were drawn in a group against the hosts Congo and Central African Republic. They lost 5–0 to the Congo on 9 December and then earned their first draw by drawing 1–1 against the Central African Republic on 14 December. On 16 December, they played a play-off for fifth place against Chad, and lost 3–2 on penalties after a 1–1 draw.

Equatorial Guinea would come in fourth in the 1987 UDEAC Cup, losing on penalties in the third place match to Gabon, even though they only scored one goal throughout the tournament in a 1–1 draw against Chad. They also drew 0–0 against Cameroon. On their next attempt, they got sixth place after losing on penalties against the Central African Republic. The next time Equatorial Guinea played the Central African Republic, in 1999, they won, 4–2. It was Equatorial Guinea's first win.

In the late 2000s, the Equatoguinean Football Federation, along with the Gabonese Football Federation, announced a bid to host the 2012 Africa Cup of Nations, against bids from other African nations including Angola, Libya and Nigeria. Equatorial Guinea and Gabon won the right to host the games, and two new stadiums were built in Equatorial Guinea: Estadio de Bata in Bata and Estadio de Malabo in Malabo.

The first game in the 2012 African Cup of Nations was Equatorial Guinea's first in a major international tournament, and resulted in a historic 1–0 win over Libya on 21 January 2012 in the opening game of the tournament. An 87th-minute strike from former Real Madrid winger Javier Balboa earned the victory. In the next game, they secured the qualification for the quarter-finals by beating Senegal 2–1, and finished second in their group after losing 0–1 to Zambia. They progressed to the quarter-finals where they were eliminated by the tournament's runners-up Ivory Coast after losing to The Elephants 3–0 thanks to goals from Didier Drogba and Yaya Touré. Various national side players were praised due to their performances in the tournament, including Javier Balboa, Randy, Ben Konaté and Rui, the latter a part of the Team of the Tournament.

Three years later, Equatorial Guinea organized solely the 2015 edition of the Africa Cup of Nations, but on this occasion, it was to replace Morocco, which was the original host. In the opener, they drew 1–1 against Congo, with Emilio Nsue opening the scoring. In the second game, they managed to play out a 0–0 draw with Burkina Faso, the runners-up of the previous edition. With these two results, the Nzalang Nacional had to win against its classic rival Gabon in the third match in order to qualify for the quarter-finals. Equatorial Guinea won 2–0 with goals from Javier Balboa (a penalty kick) and Ibán. As Group A's runner-up, the Equatoguinean national team then defeated Tunisia 2–1 with two goals from Balboa, the first being a penalty kick in the final moments of the regular time, and the second was in extra time. In the semi-final, however, they lost 0–3 to Ghana, and in the match for third place, drew 0–0 against DR Congo, ultimately losing 2–4 on penalties. The country finished the tournament in fourth place, being its best international participation to date and helping it reach a historical 49th position in the FIFA rankings.

AFCON 2022 
Equatorial Guinea continued to fail in every qualification in AFCON as the team did not qualify for 2017 and 2019 editions. Likewise, the team had also failed to qualify for 2018 FIFA World Cup. During the 2021 Africa Cup of Nations qualification, they were grouped in group J along with powerhouse Tunisia, 2019 AFCON participant Tanzania and North African bedfellow Libya. The Nzalang Nacional performed poorly in their first two games, losing both with one goal margin to Tanzania away and Tunisia at home, and it appeared that Equatorial Guinea would just end up failing as usual as the team had never qualified throughout regular qualification outside hosting the competition twice. 

However, the COVID-19 pandemic led all AFCON qualification suspended until late 2020, when it resumed as Equatorial Guinea faced up against a rising spirit Libyan side that aimed to qualify for the first time since 2012. Despite this, Equatorial Guinea produced an outstanding comeback against Libya in Egypt, beating Libya 3–2 with two late goals by Pedro Obiang and Salomón Obama from being led 1–2 until injury times. The Nzalang Nacional later hosted the same opponent at home, and like their game in Cairo, the Equatorial Guineans won again, 1–0, by virtual goal from Iban Salvador. After beating Tanzania 1–0 on home soil, Equatorial Guinea managed a historic feat throughout regular qualification for the first time ever in its history.

During AFCON 2021, the National Thunder were drawn in group E, alongside Ivory Coast, Sierra Leone and Algeria. Equatorial Guinea lost their opening match against Ivory Coast, but produced one of the tournament's surprised when they defeated trophy holders Algeria in their second match. In their final match of the group, they defeated Sierra Leone and qualified for the round of 16, coming in second in the group, after Ivory Coast.

In the round of 16, Equatorial Guinea was drawn against Mali, the winners of group F. The game ended in a goalless draw after 120 minutes and went to deciding penalties, where the Nzalang Nacional won the shoot-out 6–5 thanks to the heroics of goalkeeper Jesús Owono, who managed to save two of the shots. The result meant that the national team qualified for the quarter finals of AFCON for the third time in their history (the first one advancing from the round of 16). They subsequently lost to eventual champions Senegal, 3-1.

Naturalised players controversy

In recent years, Equatorial Guinea has courted controversy by recruiting foreign players and giving them citizenship despite having little or no ties to the country. In 2009, South African journalist and FIFA archivist Mark Gleeson wrote that it was undermining the integrity of African football.

In late 2005, and at the request of Ruslán Obiang Nsue, a son of President Teodoro Obiang, Brazilian coach Antônio Dumas recruited several Brazilian players to represent the Equatorial Guinea but the CAF and FIFA turned a blind eye, despite complaints from other nations.

In 2012, having lost the first leg of a 2013 Africa Cup of Nations qualification round 4–0 to the Democratic Republic of the Congo, Equatorial Guinea recruited nine Brazilian players to help overturn the deficit for the second leg. The team did manage to win the match 2–1, but it was not enough to overturn the aggregate and Equatorial Guinea were eliminated from the tournament. DR Congo head coach Claude Le Roy complained that the Equatorial Guinea were acting like the "United Nations of football".

Before the arrival of new coach Andoni Goikoetxea to Malabo, in March 2013, the Equatoguinean board made the squad for the 2014 FIFA World Cup qualifying match against Cape Verde and again called-up nine Brazilian players. In May 2013, they joined Colombian-born, Ecuadorian-based Jimmy Bermúdez, to who was going to pay him €3,000 for each match he plays.

During the qualifiers, in the series played against Mauritania, the Nzalang Nacional lost 1–0 away and won 3–0 in Malabo, qualifying to the next round to face Uganda. However, the Mauritanian Football Federation Submitted a complaint to CAF about the  inclusion of ineligible players by Equatorial Guinea (Some with fake passports and false names), resulting in the expulsion of the Equatorial Guinean team, based on the particular situation of Thierry Fidjeu, while the cases of the other players remained under investigation.

Home stadium

Equatorial Guinea's home stadium is Estadio de Malabo in Malabo. It can hold up to 15,250 people. Equatorial Guinea played there when they hosted the 2012 African Cup of Nations During their participation in the tournament, they played in this stadium against eventual winners Zambia and runners-up the Ivory Coast. During the national side's participation in the 2012 African Cup of Nations, they also played in the newly constructed Estadio de Bata, in which they played and won both their games in the stadium against Libya and Senegal.

Kit and colours
Equatorial Guinea wears a red and white uniform. The kit manufacturer is Erreà. When they play in Equatorial Guinea, they wear a solid red jersey and matching shorts with white stripes. The number, FEGUIFUT logo, and Erreà logo are located on the chest. The socks are red with white at the top. When Equatorial Guinea is away, they wear all white shirt with blue stripes.

Recent schedule and results

The following is a list of match results from the previous 12 months, as well as any future matches that have been scheduled.

2022

2023

Coaching history
Caretaker managers are listed in italics.

  Manuel Sanchís Martínez (1980)
  Julio Raúl González (1989–1990)
  Pedro Mabale (1998)
  Jesús Martín Dorta (1999)
  Raúl Eduardo Rodríguez (2000)
  Juan Carlos Bueriberi Echuaca (2000)
  Francisco Nsi Nchama (2002)
  Jesús Martín Dorta (2003)
  Óscar Engonga (2003)
  Adel Amrouche (2004)
  Antônio Dumas (2004–2006)
  Quique Setién (2006)
  Jordan de Freitas (2007–2008)
  Vicente Engonga (2008–2009)
  Carlos Diarte (2009–2010)
  Casto Nopo (2010)
  Henri Michel (2010)
  Casto Nopo (2011)
  Gílson Paulo (2012)
  Andoni Goikoetxea (2013–2014)
  Esteban Becker (2015–2017)
  Casto Nopo (2017)
  Franck Dumas (2017–2018)
  Casto Nopo (2018)
  Ángel López (2018–2019)
  Casto Nopo (2019)
  Dani Guindos (2019)
  Sébastien Migné (2019–2020)
  Juan Micha &  Casto Nopo (2020)
  Juan Micha (2021–present)

Coaches of local-based national team

  Rodolfo Bodipo (2017–2018) 
  Antonio Pancho (2019)
  Felipe Esono (2019–present)

Players

Current squad
The following players have been called up for two matches against Botswana on 24 and 28 March 2023.

Caps and goals updated as of 27 September 2022 after the match against Togo.

Recent call-ups
The following players have been called up in the last 12 months.

INJ Withdrew due to injury
PRE Preliminary squad
RET Retired from the national team
SUS Serving suspension
WD Player withdrew from the squad due to non-injury issue.

Previous squads

Africa Cup of Nations
2012 Africa Cup of Nations squad
2015 Africa Cup of Nations squad
2021 Africa Cup of Nations squad

Records

Players in bold are still active with Equatorial Guinea.

Most appearances

Top goalscorers

Competition records

FIFA World Cup record

Africa Cup of Nations record

African Nations Championship record

Honours

CEMAC Cup: 1
 2006

Notes

References

External links

Equatoguinean Football Federation 
Equatorial Guinea at FIFA.com

 
African national association football teams